Paragaleodes is a genus of Galeodid camel spiders, first described by Karl Kraepelin in 1899.

Species 
, the World Solifugae Catalog accepts the following twelve species:

 Paragaleodes erlangeri Kraepelin, 1903 — Ethiopia
 Paragaleodes fulvipes Birula, 1905 — Iran, Israel
 Paragaleodes judaicus Kraepelin, 1899 — Israel, Syria
 Paragaleodes melanopygus Birula, 1905 — Azerbaijan, Iran, Turkmenistan
 Paragaleodes nesterovi Birula, 1916 — Azerbaijan, Iran, Iraq
 Paragaleodes occidentalis (Simon, 1885) — Algeria, Mauritania, Morocco
 Paragaleodes pallidus (Birula, 1890) — Kazakhstan, Kyrgyzstan, Turkmenistan, Uzbekistan
 Paragaleodes scalaris (C.L. Koch, 1842) — Algeria, Egypt, Ethiopia, Saudi Arabia, Somalia, Turkmenistan, Yemen
 Paragaleodes sericeus Kraepelin, 1899 — Egypt
 Paragaleodes spinifer Birula, 1938 — Tajikistan or Uzbekistan
 Paragaleodes tunetanus Kraepelin, 1899 — Tunisia
 Paragaleodes unicolor (Birula, 1905) — Iran, Israel

References 

Arachnid genera
Solifugae